Pikadon (Japanese: ピカドン Hepburn: Pikadon, "atomic bomb") is a 1978 Japanese short animated documentary war film animated, produced and directed by Renzo Kinoshita.

Plot 
The movie starts with depiction a normal morning in Hiroshima.

Although there is no protagonist, most focus is centered around a child playing with a paper plane. At the same time he throws his paper plane through his balcony and falls, the atom bomb detonates, unleashing an unprecedented amount of destruction over people.

People burn to death, survivors’ skin melts. This scene ends with the view a small burned figure near the dome, presumably the child.

Last sequence of the work shows the child throwing his plane again, the paper plane flying instead and passing over modern-day Hiroshima as a shadow.

Legacy 
This work is reported to be shown at Japanese schools as a reminder of the nuclear bombings. It is considered an obscure short film.

References

External links 
 

Films about the atomic bombings of Hiroshima and Nagasaki
Films set in Hiroshima
1970s Japanese films